USAP, Usap, or usap may refer to:

 USA Perpignan, a rugby union club in Perpignan, France
 USA Pickleball, the national governing body for pickleball in the United States.
 Unacknowledged Special Access Program
 United States Antarctic Program
 United States Student Achievers Program
 United States Academic Pentathlon
 University of San Pedro Sula, Honduras